Damka is the Israeli name for English draughts or Checkers.

Damka may also refer to:

 Damka, One of the two space dogs surviving the fated prototype Vostok flight 22 Dec 1960

 Damka, Originaire des Hauts de Seine